The Teufelsgrundbach, also Teufelsbach, is a tributary of the Selke in the Lower Harz in Saxony-Anhalt in Germany. The stream flows through the valley of the Teufelsgrund.

See also

List of rivers of Saxony-Anhalt

Rivers of Saxony-Anhalt
Rivers of the Harz
Rivers of Germany